Ernie Johns was an Australian rules footballer who played for North Adelaide Football Club in the South Australian Football Association/League (SAFA/SAFL).  A leading forward in the period leading up to the First World War, Johns led the goal-kicking for North Adelaide for three seasons, played in two premierships and captained the club to a Grand Final loss in 1914. Johns hold a long-standing record for North Adelaide of playing eight consecutive seasons without missing a match.  Johns excelled in representative matches for South Australia, playing 22 matches and kicking 62 goals, including appearances at the 1908 Melbourne, 1911 Adelaide and 1914 Sydney Carnivals.  In 2015, Johns was an inductee into the newly established North Adelaide Football Club Hall of Fame.

References

External links 

North Adelaide Football Club players
Australian rules footballers from South Australia
1884 births
1956 deaths